Barium peroxide is an inorganic compound with the formula BaO2.  This white solid (gray when impure) is one of the most common inorganic peroxides, and it was the first peroxide compound discovered.  Being an oxidizer and giving a vivid green colour upon ignition (as do all barium compounds), it finds some use in fireworks; historically, it was also used as a precursor for hydrogen peroxide.

Structure
Barium peroxide is a peroxide, containing  subunits. The solid is isomorphous to calcium carbide, CaC2.

Preparation and use
Barium peroxide arises by the reversible reaction of O2 with barium oxide.  The peroxide forms around 500 °C and oxygen is released above 820 °C.
 2 BaO  +  O2 ⇌ 2 BaO2
This reaction is the basis for the now-obsolete Brin process for separating oxygen from the atmosphere.   Other oxides, e.g. Na2O and SrO, behave similarly.

In another obsolete application, barium peroxide was once used to produce hydrogen peroxide via its reaction with sulfuric acid:
BaO2 + H2SO4 → H2O2 + BaSO4
The insoluble barium sulfate is filtered from the mixture.

Footnotes

See also
Barium oxide

External links

MSDS at sigma aldrich

Barium compounds
Peroxides
Pyrotechnic oxidizers
Pyrotechnic colorants
Oxidizing agents